Frenken is a German surname. Notable people with the surname include:

Josef Frenken (1854–1943), German jurist and politician
Miriam Frenken (born 1984), German sprint canoeist

See also
Franken (disambiguation)
Frenkel

German-language surnames